The Radical Peasants' Party (PRȚ) was a political party in Romania.

History
The party was established by Grigore Iunian on 22 November 1933, absorbing the Democratic Peasants' Party–Stere. It won six seats in the Chamber of Deputies in the December 1933 general elections. In the 1937 elections it won nine seats, but was banned the following year following the introduction of the 1938 constitution.

Electoral history

Legislative elections

References

Agrarian parties in Romania
Defunct political parties in Romania
Political parties established in 1933
Political parties disestablished in 1938
1933 establishments in Romania
1938 disestablishments in Romania
National Peasants' Party breakaway groups